Paul Cameron is a former association football player who represented New Zealand at the international level.

Cameron played two official A-international matches for the New Zealand in 1972, both against New Caledonia, the first as a substitute in a 4–1 win on 17 September, the second starting in a 1–3 loss on 14 October 1972.

References 

20th-century births
Year of birth missing (living people)
Living people
Wellington United players
New Zealand association footballers
New Zealand international footballers
Association footballers not categorized by position